In mathematics, the Robinson–Schensted correspondence is a bijective correspondence between permutations and pairs of standard Young tableaux of the same shape. It has various descriptions, all of which are of algorithmic nature, it has many remarkable properties, and it has applications in combinatorics and other areas such as representation theory. The correspondence has been generalized in numerous ways, notably by Knuth to what is known as the Robinson–Schensted–Knuth correspondence, and  a further generalization to pictures by Zelevinsky.

The simplest description of the correspondence is using the Schensted algorithm , a procedure that constructs one tableau by successively inserting the values of the permutation according to a specific rule, while the other tableau records the evolution of the shape during construction. The correspondence had been described, in a rather different form, much earlier by Robinson , in an attempt to prove the Littlewood–Richardson rule. The correspondence is often referred to as the Robinson–Schensted algorithm, although the procedure used by Robinson is radically different from the Schensted algorithm, and almost entirely forgotten. Other methods of defining the correspondence include a nondeterministic algorithm in terms of jeu de taquin.

The bijective nature of the correspondence relates it to the enumerative identity

The Schensted algorithm 
The Schensted algorithm starts from the permutation  written in two-line notation

where , and proceeds by constructing sequentially a sequence of (intermediate) ordered pairs of Young tableaux of the same shape:

where  are empty tableaux. Because of the more passive role of the tableaux , the final one , which is part of the output and from which the previous  are easily read off, is called the recording tableau; by contrast the tableaux  are called insertion tableaux.

Insertion 

The basic procedure used to insert each  is called Schensted insertion or row-insertion (to distinguish it from a variant procedure called column-insertion). Its simplest form is defined in terms of "incomplete standard tableaux": like standard tableaux they have distinct entries, forming increasing rows and columns, but some values (still to be inserted) may be absent as entries.

More formally, the following pseudocode describes the row-insertion of a new value  into .
(This inserts the old  into row , and saves the value it replaces for insertion into the next row.)
 Increase  by 1 and return to step 2.

The shape of  grows by exactly one square, namely .

Correctness 
It can however be seen as follows. Thus the effect of the replacement in step 4 on the value  is to make it smaller; in particular it cannot become greater than its right or lower neighbours. On the other hand the new value is not less than its left neighbour (if present) either, as is ensured by the comparison that just made step 2 terminate. Finally to see that the new value is larger than its upper neighbour  if present, observe that  holds after step 5, and that decreasing  in step 2 only decreases the corresponding value .

Constructing the tableaux 
The full Schensted algorithm applied to a permutation  proceeds as follows.
 Terminate, returning the pair .

The algorithm produces a pair of standard Young tableaux.

Invertibility of the construction 

Properties 
One of the most fundamental properties, but not evident from the algorithmic construction, is symmetry:

 If the Robinson–Schensted correspondence associates tableaux  to a permutation , then it associates  to the inverse permutation .

This can be proven, for instance, by appealing to Viennot's geometric construction.

Further properties, all assuming that the correspondence associates tableaux  to the permutation .

See also
 Viennot's geometric construction, which provides a diagrammatic interpretation of the correspondence.

Notes

References
.

.
.
.
.
.

Further reading

External links

Williams, L., Interactive animation of the Robinson-Schensted algorithm

Algebraic combinatorics
Combinatorial algorithms
Permutations
Representation theory of finite groups